Richard Mytton (1500/1501–1591) was an English politician.

Biography
Mytton was the son of William Mytton, of Shrewsbury, and Cecily, the daughter of Henry Delves of Doddington. The Myttons were an influential family in the locality. His father died in 1513, when Richard Mytton was twelve or thirteen years old. It is thought he became a ward of the 10th Earl of Arundel.

He was a member of the Inner Temple.

He was Member of Parliament for Devizes in 1529; Shropshire in 1539, 1545, March 1553, October 1553 and November 1554; and MP for Shrewsbury in 1542 and April 1554. He was appointed High Sheriff of Shropshire for 1543–44 and 1559–60 and High Sheriff of Merionethshire for 1546–47 and 1553–54.

He was married three times, in 1517 a settlement was arranged to Anne, daughter of Edward Grey of Enville; to a daughter of Jenkin Piggott of Rhuddlan; in 1513 to Eleanor, daughter of George Harborne and widow of Richard Beeston of Shrewsbury.

He died on 26 November 1591, aged 90, and was buried at St Chad's Church, Shrewsbury. He outlived his eldest son and grandson, and was succeeded by his great-grandson, also called Richard. His uncle, Adam Mytton, was also an MP for Shrewsbury.

See also
Halston Hall

References

1500 births
1591 deaths
Politicians from Shrewsbury
High Sheriffs of Shropshire
High Sheriffs of Merionethshire
English MPs 1529–1536
English MPs 1539–1540
English MPs 1542–1544
English MPs 1545–1547
English MPs 1553 (Edward VI)
English MPs 1553 (Mary I)
English MPs 1554
English MPs 1554–1555